Dr. Jerry Sutton is a Southern Baptist pastor, historian, and administrator. His theology is best described as conservative and evangelical.

Biography

Early life
He earned a PhD in church history from the Southwestern Baptist Theological Seminary.

Career
He served at Two Rivers Baptist Church, in Nashville, Tennessee for twenty-two years and retired on August 3, 2008. The church averaged approximately 2,000 in average weekly attendance over the course of his pastorate.

In 1999, he led the Summit for the New Millennium which was designed to coordinate missionary efforts and church support in the 10/40 window. He served as the president of Southern Baptist Pastor's Conference in 2000 and was first Vice President of the Southern Baptist Convention in 2005. During the 2006 Tennessee Baptist Convention, he led a movement amongst Tennessee Baptist to affirm the Baptist Faith and Message 2000 edition when he proposed that all appointees of the Convention’s Committee on Committees and the Convention’s Committee on Boards be asked if they affirmed the Baptist Faith and Message 2000 edition.

He served as the first vice president of the Southern Baptist Convention from June 2005 to June 2006. In June 2006, he announced he would allow himself to be nominated for the Presidency of the Southern Baptist Convention after being repeatedly asked to run by other Southern Baptists. He made this announcement only a few days prior to the election at the Southern Baptist Convention in Greensboro, North Carolina. He ran against two other candidates, Frank Page of South Carolina and Ronnie Floyd of Arkansas. He placed third with 24.08% of the overall vote.
 In 2009 Sutton joined the faculty at Liberty University in Lynchburg, Virginia and wrote The Primer On Biblical Preaching. He took the position of Vice President of Academic Development and Dean of the Faculty at Midwestern Baptist Theological Seminary in Kansas City, Missouri in 2010.

Personal life
He is married to Fern, a professional Christian therapist, and has two daughters: Ashli, who is a licensed Tennessee and Oklahoma attorney, and Hilary, who is in content marketing.

Bibliography
The Baptist Reformation
The Way Back Home
A Matter of Conviction
A Primer on Biblical Preaching
 Lectures From the Gates of Hell

References

External links 
 Two Rivers Baptist Church
 

Living people
People from Nashville, Tennessee
Southern Baptist ministers
Year of birth missing (living people)
Baptists from Tennessee